David Swift may refer to:

 David Swift (director) (1919–2001), American director
 David Swift (actor) (1931–2016), English actor